SS Audacious was the former Italian cargo ship Belvedere taken over by the United States during World War II and sunk as a blockship at Omaha Beach on 8 June 1944. Belvedere was built in Trieste and first operated as a passenger and cargo ship when the city and company were part of Austro-Hungarian Empire. After World War I the city and ship, converted to cargo in the early 1920s, became Italian. In 1941 Belvedere was in Philadelphia when foreign ships of Axis powers were interned and then seized. The ship was taken over for operation by the War Shipping Administration through agents until scuttled at Omaha Beach.

Austro-Hungarian/Italian service
Belvedere was built by Cantiere Navale Triestino in Trieste, then part of Austro-Hungarian Empire, to operate for l'Unione Austriaco di Nav. Soc. Anon (Unione Austriaca Company) from the port of Trieste. Belvedere was built specifically for migrant and cargo trade between the Adriatic and North or South America. The ship sailed on her maiden voyage 30 August 1913 to New York by way of Patras, Messina, Palermo, and Algiers. That service continued until World War I when the ship served as a barracks ship for arsenal workers in Pola.

Belvedere became Italian flagged in 1919 when Trieste became Italian after the war. The ship operated with Unione di Nav. Soc. Anon then in 1920 by Cosulich Soc. Triestina di Nav both of Trieste. Refrigeration for beef cargo and conversion from coal to oil took place in the early 1920s. In 1936 the ship was converted to cargo with capacity for only 12 passengers. In 1937 the ship was modified to be operated by Italia S.A.di Nav, Genoa in Italy to Boston, New York and Philadelphia service.

U.S. Internment & seizure

Internment
The ship, arriving in Philadelphia on 7 June 1941, was among the 28 Italian ships interned then seized under the Ship Requisition Act signed June 6, 1941.

The United States Coast Guard had first taken possession of the ship and removed the crew under the World War I era Espionage Act of 1917 to secure the vessel and prevent damage to it or the port by enemy aliens. Sixteen of the Belvedere crew were arrested by U.S. officials and charged with sabotage. They and members of the crews of ships brought to Philadelphia from four other vessels seized in the Delaware River were accused of causing $1,000,000 damage on orders of the Italian naval attache in Washington. Those found guilty, and most charged were, got one to three year prison sentences. Appeals by the papal delegation got those serving in prison transferred to join other Italian internees at the prisoner of war camp at Fort Missoula, Montana.

War Shipping Administration Audacious
Belvedere was then seized and taken over by the War Shipping Administration 27 October 1941, renamed and flagged in Panama under the name Audacious, then assigned the same day for operation under a general agency agreement with United States Lines. On 2 November 1942 Audacious was reassigned under the same terms to the U.S. Navigation Company. Assignment of seized vessels to operating companies was under a policy of making such assignments based on cooperation of companies in developing American merchant marine interests on particular trade routes by constructing and operating vessels on such routes.

Scuttling at Omaha Beach
Audacious made a last ocean voyage in February 1944 sailing in convoy with troops and supplies to Liverpool. The voyage was in Convoy HX 280 departing from New York 20 February 1944 arriving in Liverpool 9 March. After discharge of cargo large holes were made between cargo holds and explosive charges rigged within the double bottom. The ship then went to Scotland to await the invasion. About 2,000 troops were embarked and the ship sailed under escort to arrive off the beach just after midnight 6 June 1944. The troops were disembarked into landing craft. The ship's civilian crew remained aboard awaiting the tow to the assigned scuttling position where they too disembarked into landing craft from which they could hear the charges explode and see the ship settling.

The ship was scuttled as part of the Omaha Beach Mulberry harbour breakwater 8 June 1944. The Navy prepared the blockships for defense with each having the aft deck gun removed, which was usually replaced with four 20mm and one 40mm anti-aircraft guns served by Navy Armed Guard crews. The blockships were under artillery fire by day and bombers at night. The Armed Guard aboard Audacious remained until 18 June 1944, the day before a storm wrecked the harbor.

Audacious was used as an example in written testimony by the maritime historian and author Charles Dana Gibson to the U.S. House of Representatives Subcommittee on Merchant Marine during hearings in August 1986 regarding veteran status and recognition of merchant mariners during the war. He noted that those serving on the Normandy blockships had been granted veteran status as members of The Blockship Group — Mulberry Operation, Normandy, with the application submitted specifically for "the Panamanian freighter Audacious," while those serving in equally dangerous roles at sea had not. With regard to Audacious he noted the crew had been made up of mixed nationalities, had never been a part of any military command, though blockship crews were under virtual "house arrest" by the Army to ensure secrecy, and that the blockship operation was a joint Army, Navy and WSA effort. He further noted the service aboard the blockships, some unmanned, was no more dangerous than merchant mariners aboard ships then operating for periods within the harbor created by the abandoned blockships. After repeated refusals in Congress, a court ordered veteran status to most World War II merchant mariners January 19, 1988.

Footnotes

See also
Mulberry harbour

References

External links
 Belvedere photo at Museo/Cantieristica, Monfalcone (Monfalcone Museum)
 Belvedere outboard profile at Museo/Cantieristica, Monfalcone (Monfalcone Museum)
 D/S 'Belvedere' (b.1913, Cantiere Navale Triestino, Trieste).

1913 ships
Ships built in Austria-Hungary
Merchant ships of Austria-Hungary
Merchant ships of Italy
World War II merchant ships of the United States
Scuttled vessels
Ships sunk as breakwaters
Maritime incidents in June 1944